Tumen may refer to one of the following.

Places
Tumen River, a river in China, North Korea, and Russia
Tumen, Jilin, a city in China
Tumen, Madhya Pradesh, a village in India

People 
Tumen,  Bumin Khan, Turkic Khagan
Tümen Jasagtu Khan, a Khagan of Mongolia in the late 16th century
Tumen Dashtseveg, head of the Department of Anthropology & Archaeology at the National University of Mongolia

others 
Tumen (unit), a Turkic and Mongol military unit of 10,000 people

See also
 Tuman (disambiguation)
 Tyumen (disambiguation)